Villa Quintana is a Philippine television drama romance series broadcast by GMA Network. The series is based on a 1995 Philippine television drama series of the same title. Directed by Gina Alajar, it stars Janine Gutierrez and Elmo Magalona. It premiered on November 4, 2013, on the network's Afternoon Prime line up replacing Mga Basang Sisiw. The series concluded on June 6, 2014, with a total of 153 episodes. It was replaced by The Half Sisters in its timeslot.

The series is streaming online on YouTube.

Premise
The series revolves around the love story of Isagani and Lynette, with family tensions driven from the past. Everything will change when Isagani's mother discovers a secret of the Lynette's family that will affect the fate of the relationship between Isagani and Lynette.

Cast and characters

Lead cast
 Elmo Magalona as Isagani "Gani" Digos Quintana / Isagani Samonte
 Janine Gutierrez as Lynette Mendiola Quintana

Supporting cast
 Raymart Santiago as Felix Samonte
 Sunshine Dizon as Lumeng Digos-Samonte
 Paolo Contis as Robert Quintana
 Roy Alvarez and Al Tantay as Manolo Quintana
 Maricar de Mesa as Stella Mendiola-Quintana
 Tanya Garcia as Amparing Mangaron
 Kyla as Ruby Quintana
 Marky Lopez as Chito Quintana
 Juancho Trivino as Jason "Jace" Quintana
 Rita De Guzman as Patrice Mendiola Quintana

Guest cast
 Mona Louise Rey as young Lynette
 Will Ashley de Leon as young Isagani
 Carl Acosta as young Jace
 Franchesca Salcedo as young Patrice
 Dexter Doria as Pilar Digos 
 Racquel Villavicencio as Amelia Samonte
 Rez Cortez as Alfonso Mendiola
 Anna Marin as Felicia Mendiola
 Francine Garcia as Kadyo / Megan
 Mikoy Morales as Boknoy
 Abel Estanislao as Miggy
 Shelly Hipolito as Joanne
 Nicole Dulalia as Snooky Mangaron
 Rhen Escaño as Eve
 Lucho Ayala as Noah Angeles
 Mara Alberto as Eden
 Joyce Ching as Crystal Almario
 Bettina Carlos as Janice
 Katya Santos as Linda Carillo
 Diva Montelaba as Yvette Carillo
 Ashley Cabrera as Janice's daughter

Ratings
According to AGB Nielsen Philippines' Mega Manila household television ratings, the pilot episode of Villa Quintana earned a 13.8% rating. While the final episode scored a 15.1% rating.

References

External links
 
 

2013 Philippine television series debuts
2014 Philippine television series endings
Filipino-language television shows
GMA Network drama series
Philippine romance television series
Television series reboots
Television shows set in the Philippines